Haim Yavin (born September 10, 1932), is an Israeli television anchor and documentary filmmaker. He was one of Israel's leading news presenters, associated with the job for so many decades that he was known as "Mr. Television."

Biography
Heinz Kluger (later Haim Yavin) was born in Beuthen, Oberschlesien, Germany (now Bytom, Upper Silesia, Poland). His family immigrated to Mandatory Palestine in 1933. After his marriage to Yosefa, the couple lived in Jerusalem's Talbiya neighborhood. They currently live in Tel Aviv. His son is author Jonathan Yavin.

Media career
Between 1968 and 2008, Yavin was the anchor of Mabat (lit. "Outlook"), the primetime news roundup on Israel's state television station, Channel 1, which he helped found.  He is known in Israel as "Mr. Television" and dubbed "Israel's Walter Cronkite" by the American press. He is often perceived as the "voice" of Israel. One of his famous sentences is "Ladies and gentlemen – a turnaround!" after Menachem Begin's Likud won the 1977 election. He also served as chief editor of Mabat.

Yavin sparked political controversy with his five-part documentary series The Land of the Settlers, aired on Israel's Channel 2 in May 2005. The program concluded that Israeli settlements were endangering Israel, and Israel should withdraw from the West Bank and Gaza Strip, with Yavin stating that "since 1967, [the Israelis] have been brutal conquerors, occupiers, suppressing another people." Israeli settlers were outraged by this partisan approach by a leading newscaster. At the time, Ariel Sharon's disengagement plan had not yet been implemented, and the series was viewed as propaganda in support of it. The chairman of the Yesha Council called on Channel One to fire Yavin. Instead, the Israel Broadcasting Authority signed him on for another year.

In August 2007, Yavin announced his retirement. He read the news for the last time on February 5, 2008.

Awards 
In 1997, Yavin was awarded the Israel Prize, for communications.

See also
Mabat LaHadashot ("Mabat" news show)
List of Israel Prize recipients
1977 Israeli legislative election

References

External links

1932 births
People from Bytom
People from the Province of Upper Silesia
Living people
Jewish emigrants from Nazi Germany to Mandatory Palestine
Israel Prize in communication recipients
Israeli television presenters
Israeli film directors
Channel 1 (Israel) people
Israeli television personalities
Israeli television news anchors